Wanderers F.C. was an English football club based in London.  Comprising mainly former pupils of the leading English public schools, the club was among the most dominant of the early years of organised football and won the FA Cup on five occasions, including defeating Royal Engineers in the first FA Cup final in 1872.

A total of 35 players took the field for Wanderers in the club's five FA Cup final appearances, of whom five played in three cup-winning teams.  Jarvis Kenrick scored the most goals for Wanderers in finals, with one in 1877 and two in 1878.

Positions key
GK - Goalkeeper
FB - Full back
HB - Half back
FW - Forward

Players

Notes
A.   Kinnaird's figure of two goals includes one in the 1878 final which is credited to him in some modern sources but for which contemporary newspaper reports do not identify the scorer.

References
General

Specific

Wanderers
Association football player non-biographical articles
Wanderers F.C.